Minamoto no Nakatsuna (died 1180) was an elder son of Minamoto no Yorimasa, was on active service, fighting in the Battle of Uji in 1180 during that part of Genpei War. He, his father and young brother Minamoto no Kanetsuna were fighting against Taira samurai. But they were not able to defeat the enemy so they safely returned to Byōdō-in temple for a short time. While Yorimasa's sons defended the temple, Yorimasa committed Seppuku rather than surrender. Nakatsuna soon followed.

References

Samurai
1180 deaths
Minamoto clan
People of Heian-period Japan
Year of birth unknown